Class 168 may refer to:

British Rail Class 168
Kaidai-type submarine, also known as I-168 class